Cetopsidium morenoi is a species of whale catfish that is found in the central and western portions of the Orinoco River basin in Venezuela and Colombia.

References 
 

Cetopsidae
Freshwater fish of Colombia
Fish of Venezuela
Fish described in 1972